NH 123 may refer to:

 National Highway 123 (India)
 New Hampshire Route 123, United States